George Walter was a politician.

George Walter is also the name of:

George Walter (1790–1854), English railway entrepreneur
George Walter of George Walter Brewing Company
Walter Goehr (1903-1960), German composer, who used this pseudonym in Britain

See also
George Walther (disambiguation)
George Walters (disambiguation)
Walter George (disambiguation)